XEARZ-AM is a radio station in Mexico City. Located on 1320 AM, XEARZ-AM is owned by Arnoldo Rodríguez Zermeño and broadcasts instrumental music under the name ZER Radio.

History
XEARZ-AM received its permit to operate with 5,000 watts on 1650 kHz on November 30, 2011, though Zermeño had been pursuing it since 2004. It is the newest of Mexico City's AM radio stations, likely because it was originally in the AM expanded band which was not available until the 1990s.

Zermeño owns stations in the states of Aguascalientes, Colima, Jalisco, Sonora and Zacatecas in addition to XEARZ-AM.

In April 2021, the Federal Telecommunications Institute ordered XEARZ to move to 1320 kHz. The frequency had become open due to the closure of XENET-AM (whose concession expired in 2016), and the IFT required the move because the AM expanded band was reserved in 2014 for new community and indigenous stations, with existing stations above 1600 kHz to move off the band where feasible. The station moved to 1320 in October 2021.

Note

References

Radio stations established in 2012
Radio stations in Mexico City